Innlandet Church is a parish church of the Church of Norway in Hadsel Municipality in Nordland county, Norway. It is located in the village of Hennes on the island of Hinnøya. It is one of the churches for the Hadsel parish which is part of the Vesterålen prosti (deanery) in the Diocese of Sør-Hålogaland. The white, wooden church was built in a long church style in 1992 to serve the part of Hadsel municipality on the island of Hinnøya. The church seats about 100 people. The church was historically called Hennes kapell (chapel).

See also
List of churches in Sør-Hålogaland

References

Hadsel
Churches in Nordland
Wooden churches in Norway
20th-century Church of Norway church buildings
Churches completed in 1992
1992 establishments in Norway
Long churches in Norway